In cricket, a five-wicket haul (also known as a "five–for" or "fifer") refers to a bowler taking five or more wickets in a single innings. This is regarded as a notable achievement. To date, 159 cricketers have taken a five-wicket haul on debut in a Test match, with eight of them being taken by cricketers representing Bangladesh.

They have taken a five-wicket haul on debut against four different opponents with West Indies being the most frequent opponent. Five-wicket haul were taken five times against the West Indies side. The other three times this incident occurred against three different sides; one each against England, India and Zimbabwe. Of the eight occasions the Bangladesh won the match only twice and drew once. The other five were lost. Both the wins and the only draw came against the West Indian cricket team.

The players have taken five-wicket hauls at five different venues. Five of them came in Bangladesh and the other three came in overseas.
The most common venue for a Bangladesh player to achieve the feat is Zahur Ahmed Chowdhury Stadium in Chattogram, where it has occurred three times. Among the three hauls occurred overseas, two of them took place at Arnos Vale Stadium, Kingstown in West Indies. The other one came at Queens Sports Club, Bulawayo in Zimbabwe.

Naimur Rahman took a five-wicket haul in the very first test Bangladesh played against India in 2000, making him the first debutant for Bangladesh to take a five-wicket haul. He took six wickets for 132 runs in India's first innings. Along with Rahman, a total of five players have taken six wickets at debut. The other four players are Mohammad Manjural Islam, Elias Sunny, Sohag Gazi and Mehidy Hasan. Three players have taken five wickets at debut. Among the players Nayeem Hasan is the youngest bowler for Bangladesh to take a five wicket haul for Bangladesh.

Sohag Gazi holds the best figure in an innings by a debutant Bangladeshi bowler with his 6 wickets for 74 runs against West Indies. Gazi also holds the record for best bowling figure in a match with 9 wickets for 219 runs. Mehidy Hasan was the most economical debutant to take five-wicket haul, taking 6 wickets for 80 runs against England at a economy rate of 2.00 runs per over. Mahmudullah Riyad has the best average. He took 5 wickets for 51 runs at an average of 10.20 runs per wicket. Nayeem Hasan accounted the best strike rate. His strike rate was 16.8 when he took 5 wickets in 14 overs against West Indies. The most recent bowler to achieve the feat was Nayeem Hasan in November 2018.

Key

Five-wicket hauls

Notes

References

External links 
 Query Menu at ESPNCricinfo

Bangladesh
Test

Cricket records and statistics
Lists of Bangladeshi cricket records and statistics